Qeshlaq-e Seyyedlar Sari Quyi Hajj Bayram (also Romanized as Qeshlāq-e Seyyedlar Sārī Qūyī Ḩājj Bayrām) is a village in Qeshlaq-e Jonubi Rural District, Qeshlaq Dasht District, Bileh Savar County, Ardabil Province, Iran. At the 2006 census, its population was 36, in 5 families.

References 

Populated places in Bileh Savar County
Towns and villages in Bileh Savar County